Cilaos is a town and commune on the French island of Réunion in the Indian Ocean. It is located centrally on the island, in a caldera of altitude 1,214 m. The caldera (usually known as the 'Cirque') is also named for the community.

History
The name Cilaos comes from the Malagasy word, Tsilaosa (modern form : tsy ilaozana), which means the place one does not abandon.

According to some historians , the word Cilaos finds its origins in the name of a Malagasy slave named Tsilaos who took refuge in this cirque. At the time, slaves were called "brown", whereas runaway slaves were called "black-brown".

The first inhabitants of the cirque of Cilaos were thus "black-browns" who believed themselves to be at the top of the world and completely safe. However, these first runaways were recaptured very quickly, tracked and hunted by well-organized and well-armed slaveholders. In these runaways' attempts to escape recapture, several were killed. It seems likely that these first runaways created the goat paths that climb most of the mountains on Réunion.

After the death or recapture of these runaway slaves, the cirque of Cilaos likely became uninhabited once again for a while, since the first official record of its settlement occur only around 1850. In this year, a spa station was set up, and by 1866, there were 960 inhabitants. By 1900, the population had risen to 2500, and the 1982 census recorded 5629 inhabitants in the whole cirque.

From 15 to 16 March 1952, 1,870mm (73 inches) of rain fell in Cilaos in 24 hours, the greatest amount of rain ever to fall in one day. 

The commune of Cilaos was created on 4 February 1965 when it seceded from the commune of Saint-Louis.

Population

Embroidery

The introduction of embroidery was due to the efforts of Angèle MacAuliffe, daughter of a doctor who worked at a hot-spring clinic in the early 20th century. The techniques that she introduced have scarcely changed since, and the popularity of "Days of Cilaos" embroidery is due in a large part to this stability and tradition.

This local embroidery has been transmitted for over 100 years by local nuns (such as Sister Cécile and Sister Irénée). In 1954, the "Sewing room of Cilaos" was created and Sister Anasthasie (Marie-Hélène Techer) was appointed as its leader. Sister Anasthasie would do her utmost to teach a hundred young girls her embroidery techniques, and she was recognized in 1983 when she received the gold medal "Best worker in France" competition in the lace and embroidery category. In the 1980s, these embroidered works were generally sold out of the workers' homes or more frequently from roadside stands. Furthermore, an association for the promotion of Cilaosian lace was created in 1983 to protect and develop this important craft of the Cirque. In 1985, this association had 50 embroidery workers. Its president was Ms. Suzanne Maillot, Sister Anasthasie's assistant at the "Sewing-room of Cilaos".

Today, an embroidery house of the association lets a few workers learn and show tourists this delicate art.

Climate

Cilaos has a subtropical highland climate (Cwb), with a mild to warm, very rainy wet season from December to April, and a drier, mild season the rest of the year.

See also
Communes of the Réunion department

References

External links
 Trail in Cilaos
 The cirque of Cilaos
 the map of trails in Cilaos
 les gîtes : la liste des gîtes et hébergements
 Le Piton des Neiges

Communes of Réunion
Calderas of Réunion